Paulette Noizeux (born Marie-Paule Cœuré; 30 May 1887 – 9 April 1971) was a French stage and film actress who began her career on the stages of France and New York in the 1910s. Her career spanned sixty years.

Noizeux was born in Saint-Omer, Pas-de-Calais, France. She made her film debut in the 1911 Abel Gance-directed film short La Digue, opposite actors Jean Renoir and Jean Toulout. The film is notable for being Gance's directoral debut.  She would go on to have a prolific stage career in her native France, as well as appearing on Broadway in several plays from 1917 to 1918.

Noizeux was married to stage and screen actor Noël Roquevert. Her last film appearance was a small part in the 1968 Norbert Terry-directed Swiss/French joint film production Jeunes filles bien... pour tous rapports (English release title: The Sexy Dozen), in which her husband also appeared.

Paulette Noizeux died in Paris in 1971 at the age of 83.

Selected filmography

References

External links

1887 births
1971 deaths
French stage actresses
French film actresses
French silent film actresses
People from Saint-Omer
20th-century French actresses